The Convention of Republican Institutions (CIR) was a socialist and republican party in France led by François Mitterrand. The CIR, founded in early June 1964, transformed from a loosely organized club to a formal political party by April 1965, a few months before the time of Mitterrand's candidacy in the 1965 election. Roughly at the same time, the CIR played an important role in the foundation of the Federation of the Democratic and Socialist Left (FGDS), which ended with the FGDS' landslide defeat to the Gaullists in the 1968 election.

The CIR merged into the Socialist Party at the Epinay Congress in 1971.

1964 establishments in France
1971 disestablishments in France
Defunct political parties in France
Defunct socialist parties in Europe
Political parties disestablished in 1971
Political parties established in 1964
Political parties of the French Fifth Republic
Socialist parties in France
Socialist Party (France)